Anima, Togo is a village in the Doufelgou Prefecture in the Kara Region  of north-eastern Togo.

References

Populated places in Kara Region
Doufelgou Prefecture